Cheech & Chong's Greatest Hit is a comedy album by Cheech & Chong. The album is a "greatest hits" compilation, featuring some of their best known comedy bits.  Some tracks were edited for this release: most notably, the 1:34 track "Dave" is broken into two separate tracks, and is edited down for time.  Also, "Earache My Eye" fades out just before the start of the argument between father and son.

Track listing

Side 1
 Dave 0:39
 Earache My Eye 2:28
 Let's Make a Dope Deal 3:56
 Basketball Jones 4:00
 Blind Melon Chitlin' 4:20
 Sister Mary Elephant 3:30
 Sargent Stadanko 6:30
 Dave (continued) 0:16

Side 2
 Cruisin' With Pedro De Pacas 3:51
 The Continuing Adventures Of Pedro De Pacas And Man 6:00
 Pedro And Man At The Drive-Inn 12:44
 Trippin' In Court 5:57

Charts

See also
Cheech & Chong

References

Cheech & Chong albums
1981 greatest hits albums
Warner Records compilation albums
1980s comedy albums